Eintracht Frankfurt played their very first official match in competitive European football on 11 November 1959. This was a European Cup first round game against BSC Young Boys of Switzerland. The match ended in a 4–1 away victory for the Eintracht. However, a Frankfurt XI took part already earlier in the Inter-Cities Fairs Cup with several Eintracht players in the squad. Requirements had it that the best players from the eligible teams Eintracht Frankfurt, FSV Frankfurt, Kickers Offenbach and SpVgg 03 Neu-Isenburg were picked to form a representative inter-city side.

Summary

The club's first ever match against European opponents was a friendly match against Swedish side Malmö FF in 1920 when the Scanians visited Germany.

In season 1959–60, Eintracht took part in the European Cup. In this season, they became the first German club to reach a European final, eventually losing 7–3 to Real Madrid.

In the 1966–67 season, the club played in the Intertoto Cup which they finally won, facing Inter Bratislava in the final. Plus in the same season, Eintracht played in the Inter-Cities Fairs Cup and reached the semi-finals. In 1967, the Eagles won the Cup of the Alps, a tournament then composed of Italian, Swiss and German teams.

Frankfurt's first appearance in the renamed UEFA Cup was in 1972, the first step in the Cup Winners' Cup stage was made in 1974.

In the 1979–80 edition of the UEFA Cup, Eintracht reached the finals. The first leg was lost at fellow West German club Borussia Mönchengladbach, but the second leg was decided by the send on striker Fred Schaub in the 81st minute and secured the Mainhattan club the first major European title.

In the 1980s, the club struggled to participate regularly in European competitions.

Between the beginning to the mid-1990s the Eagles re-established themselves as a powerhouse in Europe and advanced far in the UEFA Cup regularly with players such as Uwe Bein, Jay-Jay Okocha, Uli Stein, Ralf Weber and Tony Yeboah on the books.

Despite reaching the 1994–95 UEFA Cup quarter-finals, Eintracht bounced between the first two tiers for almost ten years after the relegation from the Bundesliga in the 1995–96 campaign.

Since 2005, they were part of the first Bundesliga again and immediately qualified for the UEFA Cup due to the participation in the DFB Cup final against Bayern Munich who were already qualified for the Champions League. In the following UEFA Cup campaign, Eintracht reached the group stage and seemed to be likely to advance to the next round but conceded two goals at Fenerbahçe after being up 2–0 what meant that Eintracht had to defer to the Istanbul club.

In 2013, Eintracht played at Bordeaux with 12,000 fans from Frankfurt and about 8,000 Bordeaux supporters. Eintracht were eliminated in the round of 32 after drawing twice with Porto.

In 2018, the qualification for the Europa League group stage was achieved by winning the DFB Cup for the first time in  thirty years. In the 2018–19 Europa League, Luka Jović with his ten goals aided Eintracht to reach the semi-finals of the competition, only losing on penalties to the eventual champions, Chelsea.

On 14 April 2022, over 20,000 fans travelled as Eintracht defeated Barcelona 3–2 at the Camp Nou and 4–3 on aggregate in the 2021–22 UEFA Europa League to qualify for the semi-finals. On 18 May 2022, Eintracht secured the Europa League title after winning 5–4 on penalties (1–1 after extra time) against Rangers in the final.

On 10 August 2022, Eintracht played in their first Super Cup final against 2021–22 UEFA Champions Winners Real Madrid in Helsinki. They lost the game 2–0.

Overall record

Accurate as of 15 March 2023

Legend: GF = Goals For. GA = Goals Against. GD = Goal Difference.

UEFA competitions

Non-UEFA Competitions

Teams played
Eintracht Frankfurt have played against clubs from 35 countries (clubs classed by the country they were in when the game was played). Eintracht have played 96 different clubs in Europe.

Record by country of opposition

 Pld – Played; W – Won; D – Drawn; L – Lost

Record players
Key
SC = UEFA Super Cup, EC / CL = European Cup / Champions League, CLQ = Champions League Qualifying, EL / UC = Europa League / UEFA Cup, ELQ = Europa League Qualifying, CWC = Cup Winners' Cup, UIC = Intertoto Cup

Most appearances

Top goalscorers
Numbers in brackets indicate appearances made. Ø = goals per game

Map

References

Notes

Sources

Europe
German football clubs in international competitions